Verbena, also known as Summerfield,  is an unincorporated community in southeastern Chilton County, Alabama, United States.  Named for the indigenous flower, Verbena developed into a popular resort location for the more affluent citizenry of Montgomery, the state's capital, during the yellow fever outbreaks of the late 19th and early 20th centuries.  Many stately homes, some of which have undergone recent renovation and restoration, line the streets of the town as a reminder of this historic past.

The town was built beside the railroad currently owned by CSX Transportation.  In its heyday, Verbena had two hotels, a bank, a post office, and a general store.  Many of those buildings are gone or boarded up today, but the Verbena United Methodist Church still stands on County Road 59 near the town's center.

According to the U.S. Census in 1890, Verbena showed a population of 756, making it the largest community in Chilton County at that time.

Modern era
Today, Verbena is a quiet community on the outskirts of Clanton.  The town is located on U.S. Route 31  four miles south of Interstate 65 exit 205.  It has a USPS Post Office (ZIP Code 36091), several small specialty stores, and numerous churches.  The local school is Verbena High School (K5-12), home of the Red Devils.  The community is served by the Chilton County Sheriff's Department and Verbena Volunteer Fire and Rescue.

Other communities in the area that are typically considered to be a part of Verbena are Cooper (pronounced "Coopers" by many locals), Enterprise (not to be confused with the city of Enterprise in South Alabama), and Midway.

The town is listed on the National Register of Historic Places.

Gallery

Climate
The climate in this area is characterized by hot, humid summers and generally mild to cool winters.  According to the Köppen Climate Classification system, Verbena has a humid subtropical climate, abbreviated "Cfa" on climate maps.

References

McKinney, S. B. (1981). Verbena, a town born of yellow fever. [Verbena, Ala.]: Verbena Historical Society. OCLC# 21390772

External links

Verbena Historical Society
Verbena United Methodist Church

Historic districts in Chilton County, Alabama
Populated places established in 1873
National Register of Historic Places in Chilton County, Alabama
Unincorporated communities in Alabama
Unincorporated communities in Chilton County, Alabama
Birmingham metropolitan area, Alabama
Historic districts on the National Register of Historic Places in Alabama